The diocesan governor of Hamar  in Norway was a government agency of the Kingdom of Norway. The title was  before 1919, and in 1919 all stiftamt were abolished in favor of equal counties. 

The  (principal county) of Hamar was established in 1864 by the king. It was split off from the large Christiania stiftamt and originally made up of two subordinate counties: Kristians amt and Hedemarkens amt. Hamar stiftamt was led by a stiftamtmann and the subordinate counties were led by an amtmann. The seat of the stiftamt was the city of Hamar. In 1919, there was a large county reorganization in Norway and every stiftamt was abolished and the counties were renamed .

The diocesan governor is the government's representative in the diocese which was made up of multiple subordinate counties. The governor carries out the resolutions and guidelines of the Storting and government. This is done first by the governor performing administrative tasks on behalf of the ministries. Secondly, the diocesan governor also monitors the activities of the county governors and the municipalities and is the appeal body for many types of municipal decisions.

List of diocesan governors
Hamar stiftamt has had the following governors:

References

Hamar